Hunwick railway station served the village of Hunwick, County Durham, England from 1857 to 1964 on the Durham to Bishop Auckland Line.

History 
The station opened on 1 April 1857 by the North Eastern Railway. It was situated on the south side of Station Road. The goods yard consisted of a single siding behind the up platform. The goods facilities at the station were basic, handling general goods and parcels but not livestock. On the north side of the level crossing were Hunwick Colliery, Tillery and Brickworks. The goods facilities were withdrawn from the station on 15 September 1958 and it was closed to passengers on 4 May 1964.

References

External links 

Disused railway stations in County Durham
Former North Eastern Railway (UK) stations
Railway stations in Great Britain opened in 1857
Railway stations in Great Britain closed in 1964
Beeching closures in England
1857 establishments in England
1964 disestablishments in England
Crook, County Durham